This page shows the results of the Cycling Competition at the 1955 Pan American Games, held from March 12 to March 26, 1955 in Mexico City, Mexico. There were a total number of five medal events, with only men competing.

Track cycling

Men's 1000m Match Sprint (Track)

Men's 1000m Time Trial (Track)

Men's 4000m Team Pursuit (Track)

Road cycling

Men's Individual Race (Road)

Men's Team Race (Road)

References
 
 
 
  .

1955
Events at the 1955 Pan American Games
Pan American Games
Pan American Games
Pan American Games
1955 Pan American Games